Barcelona is a 1994 American comedy-drama film written and directed by Whit Stillman and set in Barcelona. The film stars Taylor Nichols, Chris Eigeman and Mira Sorvino.

Barcelona is the second film (after Metropolitan (1990) and preceding The Last Days of Disco (1998)) in what Stillman calls his "Doomed-Bourgeois-in-Love series". The three films are independent of each other except for the cameo appearances of some common characters.

Plot
The main character in Barcelona is a Chicago salesman named Ted Boynton, who lives and works in the eponymous Spanish city in 1987. Ted's cousin, Fred, a naval officer, unexpectedly comes to stay with Ted at the beginning of the film. Fred has been sent to Barcelona to handle public relations on behalf of a U.S. fleet scheduled to arrive later.

The cousins have a history of conflict since childhood, to which the film refers several times. Ted and Fred develop relationships with various single women in Barcelona and experience the negative reactions of some of the community's residents to the context of Fred's presence. Ted also faces possible problems with his American employer and with the concept of attraction to physical beauty.

Cast

 Taylor Nichols as Ted Boynton
 Chris Eigeman as Fred Boynton
 Tushka Bergen as Montserrat Raventos
 Mira Sorvino as Marta Ferrer
 Pep Munné as Ramon
 Hellena Schmied as Greta
 Nuria Badia as Aurora Boval
 Jack Gilpin as The Consul
 Thomas Gibson as Dickie Taylor

Reception
Barcelona received an 83% rating on Rotten Tomatoes based on 35 reviews.

Year-end lists
 5th – Bob Strauss, Los Angeles Daily News
 7th – Yardena Arar, Los Angeles Daily News
 8th – Todd Anthony, Miami New Times
 Top 9 (not ranked) – Dan Webster, The Spokesman-Review
 Top 10 (listed alphabetically, not ranked) – Steve Murray, The Atlanta Journal-Constitution
 Top 10 (not ranked) – Betsy Pickle, Knoxville News-Sentinel
 Best "sleepers" (not ranked) – Dennis King, Tulsa World

References

External links

 
 
 
 
 Phil's whitstillman.org "Barcelona" page (links on the film)
 Barcelona: Innocence Abroad an essay by Haden Guest at the Criterion Collection

1994 films
1990s romantic comedy-drama films
American political comedy-drama films
American romantic comedy-drama films
Films directed by Whit Stillman
Cold War films
Films set in Barcelona
Films shot in Barcelona
Films set in the 1980s
Castle Rock Entertainment films
1990s political comedy-drama films
1990s English-language films
Films set in 1987
1990s American films
American independent films
1994 independent films